Nobody's Children is a 1940 American drama film directed by Charles Barton and starring Edith Fellows, Billy Lee, Georgia Caine and Lois Wilson. It was produced and distributed by Columbia Pictures.

Cast

 Edith Fellows as 	Pat
 Billy Lee as 	Tommy
 Georgia Caine as 	Mrs. Marshall
 Lois Wilson as Miss Jamieson
 Walter White Jr. as 	Walter White Jr.
 Ben Taggart as Mr. Millar
 Mary Currier as 	Mrs. Millar
 Mary Gordon as 	Mary
 Lillian West as 	Miss Spellman
 William Gould as 	Dr. Tovar
 Dorothy Adams as 	Mrs. Alice Stone 
 Russell Hicks as 	Sen. Lawrence Hargrave 
 Georgia Backus as Mrs. Wynn
 Ivan Miller as Mr. John Stone 
 Lloyd Whitlock as 	Mr. Gibney
 Edythe Elliott as Mrs. King 
 John Marston as 	Mr. Ferber
 Mira McKinney as 	Mrs. Ferber 
 Edward Earle as 	Mr. Rogers 
 Joel Friedkin as 	Tim, the Grocery Man 
 	Lee Millar as	Dr. Gireaux 
 Freddie Chapman as	Hal 
 Janet Chapman as 	Peggy 
 Joel Davis as	Vincent
 Nell Craig as Hospital Receptionist 
 Evelyn Young as Nurse

References

Bibliography
 Dick, Bernard F. Columbia Pictures: Portrait of a Studio. University Press of Kentucky, 2015.
 Etling, Laurence. Radio in the Movies: A History and Filmography, 1926–2010. McFarland, 2011.
 Fetrow, Alan G. Feature Films, 1940-1949: a United States Filmography. McFarland, 1994.

External links
 

1940 films
1940 drama films
1940s English-language films
American drama films
American black-and-white films
Columbia Pictures films
Films directed by Charles Barton
1940s American films